Sai Ohn Kyaw  (born 4 August 1944) is a Burmese politician who currently serves as a House of Nationalities member of parliament for Shan State No. 4 constituency.

Early life and education
He was born on 4 August 1944 in Kyaukme, Shan State, Burma (Myanmar). He graduated with B.Sc from Mandalay University.

Political career
He is a member of the Shan Nationalities League for Democracy. In the Myanmar general election, 2015, he was elected as an Amyotha Hluttaw MP and elected representative from Shan State No. 4 parliamentary constituency.

References

Shan Nationalities Democratic Party politicians
1944 births
Living people
People from Shan State
Mandalay University alumni